Grace Cottage Family Health & Hospital is an independent, non-profit critical access hospital and rural health clinic located in Townshend, Vermont. The 19-bed hospital specializes in serving patients with acute, rehabilitative and palliative care needs. The hospital has a 24/7 emergency department, a diagnostic imaging department and a full-service laboratory. Grace Cottage Family Health has ten primary care providers, a pediatrician, a psychiatric nurse practitioner, a urologist, and podiatrist. Physical, occupational, and speech therapy are offered to inpatients and outpatients. The hospital also operates a retail pharmacy, Messenger Valley Pharmacy.

References

External links 
 

Hospital buildings completed in 1949
Hospitals in Vermont
Buildings and structures in Townshend, Vermont
Cottage hospitals
1949 establishments in Vermont
Hospitals established in 1949